Dr. Byron Cook is an American computer science researcher at University College London.  Byron's research interests include program analysis/verification, programming languages, theorem proving, logic, hardware design, and operating systems.  Byron's recent work has been focused on the development of automatic tools for 
 Proving properties of biological models,
 Termination and liveness proving, and
 Discovering invariants regarding mutable data structures.

Awards and Prizes 

In 2009, Cook won the Roger Needham Award.  His public lecture was on "Proving that programs eventually do something good".

Cook was elected as a Fellow of the Royal Academy of Engineers in 2019.

References

External links 
 http://www0.cs.ucl.ac.uk/staff/b.cook/

Year of birth missing (living people)
Living people
British computer scientists